Tubyzovo is a rural locality (a village) in Pelymskoye Rural Settlement, Kochyovsky District, Perm Krai, Russia. The population was 8 as of 2010. There is 1 street.

Geography 
Tubyzovo is located 16 km north of Kochyovo (the district's administrative centre) by road. Zyryanovo is the nearest rural locality.

References 

Rural localities in Kochyovsky District